FWPA may refer to:

 Federal Way Public Academy
 Federal Water Power Act